The Texas Book Festival is a free annual book fair held in Austin, Texas.  The festival takes place in late October or early November. It is one of the top book festivals in the United States.

Beginnings
The festival was established in 1995 by Laura Bush, then the First Lady of Texas, and Mary Margaret Farabee, wife of former State Senator Ray Farabee. The festival was initially created to benefit the state's public library system, promotes the joy of reading, and honor Texas authors. The first festival took place at the Texas State Capitol in November 1996.

Expansion
Since then, the festival has greatly expanded, with a focus on nationally known authors, attracting major bestsellers and award-winners. The revised mission statement: "The Texas Book Festival connects authors and readers through experiences that celebrate the culture of literacy, ideas, and imagination." 

With the assistance of Honorary Chairman and librarian, Mrs. Bush, and a task force, the festival has grown, hosting more than 2,000 authors since its introduction. It grew to hosting about 250 authors each year and attracting more than 40,000 attendees.

Bookend Award
Each year, the festival honors a writer with the "Bookend Award" for outstanding contribution to the literature of Texas. In addition to the award event, the festival includes children's books, crafts, and costumed characters.

Selected annual details
In 2015, the festival hit a record 300 authors, including Booker Prize winner Margaret Atwood, Pulitzer Prize-winning novelist Elizabeth Strout, Pulitzer Prize-winning critic Margo Jefferson, politicians Gary Hart and John Sununu, Jonathan Lethem, Lemony Snicket, Taye Diggs, Leonard Pitts, Robert Christgau and Jessica Hopper.

In 2020, the festival was held online, caused by the COVID-19 pandemic.

In 2021, a hybrid was held, with both online and limited in-person components.

See also

 Books in the United States
 National Book Festival, founded by Laura Bush and James H. Billington in 2001

References

Citations

Works cited

Further reading

External links

 Official website
 Photos of the 2015 festival
 The Austin Chronicle's full coverage of the current/latest festival

1995 establishments in Texas
Book fairs in the United States
Festivals established in 1995
Festivals in Austin, Texas
Laura Bush
Literary festivals in the United States
Texas literature